Brian Partlow is a former arena football coach. He last served as the offensive coordinator of the Cleveland Gladiators in the Arena Football League. He is the former  head coach for the Austin Wranglers where he had a career record of 4-12, including a 0-0 mark in the postseason. He spent the 2006, 2005, and 2004 seasons as the offensive coordinator of the Colorado Crush. The Crush won the ArenaBowl championship in 2005. Partlow led one of the top ranked offenses in the league helping WR Damien Harrell win offensive player of the year in 2005 and 2006 while breaking the single season record for receiving touchdowns. In 2003, 2002, 2001, and 2000 Partlow coached for the Indiana/Albany Firebirds in the Arena Football League spending two seasons as the offensive coordinator. Partlow also has experience coaching college football including stops at The College of William and Mary, Shenandoah College, and Randolph Macon College. Also, in 2006 he had a daughter named Addison, a great ballerina, and in 2008 he had a son named Tyler, an amazing tennis player.

Biography 
In college, Partlow broke numerous school and conference records as a quarterback at Randolph-Macon College. He arrived at Randolph-Macon after transferring from The College of William and Mary.

In high school, Partlow was named to numerous all-American teams, was named the Virginia High School Coaches Association Offensive Player of the Year, was named the Co-Offensive Player of the Year by the Washington Post, and was named the starting quarterback in the Virginia High School Coaches Association All-Star Game all while leading the Handley Judges to an undefeated season and the AA state championship.

References

External links 
 Brian Partlow at ArenaFan Online

Year of birth missing (living people)
Living people
Austin Wranglers coaches
People from Winchester, Virginia
Randolph–Macon Yellow Jackets football players
Shenandoah Hornets football coaches
William & Mary Tribe football players
William & Mary Tribe football coaches
Indiana Firebirds coaches
Colorado Crush coaches
Cleveland Gladiators coaches